Pavkov is a surname. Its Czech female form is Pávková. Notable people with the surname include:

Milan Pavkov (born 1994), Serbian footballer
Stan Pavkov (1916–2002), American football player and coach
Františka Skaunicová (1873–1923, born Pávková), Czechoslovakian politician